Antique, officially the Province of Antique, is a province in the Philippines located in the Western Visayas region. Its capital is San Jose de Buenavista, the most populous town in Antique. The province is situated in the western section of Panay Island and borders Aklan, Capiz and Iloilo to the east, while facing the Sulu Sea to the west.

The province is home to the indigenous Iraynun-Bukidnon, speakers of a dialect of the Kinaray-a language, who have crafted the only rice terrace clusters in the Visayas through indigenous knowledge and sheer vernacular capabilities. The rice terraces of the Iraynun-Bukidnon are divided into four terraced fields, namely, General Fullon rice terraces, Lublub rice terraces, Bakiang rice terraces, and San Agustin rice terraces. All of the rice terrace clusters have been researched by the National Commission for Culture and the Arts and various scholars from the University of the Philippines. There have been campaigns to nominate the Iraynun-Bukidnon Rice Terraces, along with the Central Panay Mountain Range, into the UNESCO World Heritage List.

Etymology
Antique was one of the three  (districts) of Panay before Spanish colonizers arrived on the islands. The province was known at that time as Hantík, the local name for the large black ants found on the island. The Spanish chroniclers, influenced by the French, recorded the region's name as Hantique with the (silent 'h'), but this was only adopted in areas near Malandog River in present Hamtic town which then became the provincial capital (shortly before Bugason and San Jose). The province bearing its former capital's name is spelled and pronounced as "Antique" (än-ti-ké), without 'h' and pronounced in (Kinaray-a) dialectic way.

History

Precolonial 

Historians believe that the earliest people who settled on the island of Panay were tribal Negritos or Atis. Oral history, relayed as the "Maragtas", states that ten "datus" or minor tribal Malay chieftains escaped persecution from a city called Odtohan from Borneo due to a tyrant ruler called Makatunaw. The ten datus, led by Datu Puti, sailed northward with their families and communities, landing on Panay after departing Borneo. There are claims that the narrative of the Maragtas is dated to 1212 to fit with the transition of the Srivijayan Empire to Majapahit but there are no written evidence about this, nor there are any existing claims that links the datus to Borneo. Nevertheless, the Maragtas narrative is to be considered as part of the local history of the people.

Upon arrival, the Malay datus met the Ati chieftain Datu Marikudo and his wife Maniwantiwan. They offered the chieftain a salakot (wide-brimmed hat) (out of exaggeration, the present day locals believed to be of pure gold) which includes a golden necklace, earrings, bracelets and trinkets they wore when they fled Borneo among other gifts of pearls and fine clothes as a display of respect and to buy the land for them to live. Datu Marikudo responded to the datus' generosity by giving the Malayans the lowlands and moving to the mountains with his Ati tribe as the mountains are sacred to them. The legacy of this landing is commemorated annually in Antique during the Binirayan festival.

The island of Panay was then divided into three : Hantik, Akean and Irong-Irong. Irong-Irong became Iloilo, Akean became the present-day Aklan and Capiz, and Hantik (also called Hamtik or Hamtic) became Antique. Hantik was named for the large black ants found on the island called "hantik-hantik".

The  of Hantik was given to Datu Sumakwel, one of the ten datus, and who, according to tradition, was a sword master and wisest of them. The three  were later governed as a political unit called the Kedatuan of Madja-as, also under Datu Sumakwel. Datu Sumakwel founded the town of Malandog, considered to be the first Malay settlement in the country. Malandog is now a barangay in the present-day municipality of Hamtic, which was named after the historic .

Spanish colonial period 
During the Spanish colonial period, the coastal province was vulnerable to attacks by Moro raiders. Under the direction of the Spanish friars, a series of watchtowers, like the 'Old Watchtower' in Libertad and Estaca Hill in Bugasong, were built to guard Antique.

In 1790, Antique was converted into a politico-military province with the town of Antique (now Hamtic) as its first capital. The provincial seat of government was later transferred to Bugasón (old name of Bugasong), and finally to San Jose de Buenavista.

Second World War 
In 1942, the Imperial Japanese Army landed in Antique and occupied the province during the Second World War.

During the Japanese Insurgencies and Occupation (1942-1944), the military general headquarters and camp bases of the 6th and 62nd Infantry Division of the Philippine Commonwealth Army was active from January 3, 1942, to June 30, 1946, and the military general headquarters and camp bases of the 6th Constabulary Regiment of the Philippine Constabulary was re-activated between October 28, 1944, and June 30, 1946. Additionally, during the implementation of the anti-imperial Japanese military operations on Panay Island between 1942 and 1945 in the Antique province, Filipino military forces aided the local guerrilla resistance against the Imperial Japanese Army.

Between 1944 and 1945, Philippine Commonwealth forces of the 6th Constabulary Regiment of the Philippine Constabulary and the 6th and 62nd Infantry Division of the Philippine Commonwealth Army defeated the Japanese troops and liberated the province. The liberation was achieved with the active support of recognized local guerrillas.

During the Marcos dictatorship 

One of the significant events of the Philippines's Martial Law era was the Bacong Bridge Massacre, which took place in the town of Culasi, Antique on December 19, 1981. Sometimes also known as the Culasi incident, it involved the Philippine Constabulary killing 5 protester-farmers at the Bacong River bridge in Culasi's Barangay Malacañang. The victims were identified as Leopoldo A. Anos, Aquilino M. Castillo, Fortunato M. Dalisay, Remegildo P. Dalisay, and Joel B. Plaquino, and were later honored at the Philippines' Bantayog ng mga Bayani, which recognizes the heroes and martyrs who fought the authoritarian regime.

Discovery of the Antique Rice Terraces 
In 2014, the first ever Philippine rice terraces found outside the Cordilleras was discovered in Antique through satellite and a team of scientists and locals. The heritage site, known as the Antique Rice Terraces of the Panay-Bukidnon people, is believed to be at least 200 years old. In 2017, the province hosted the Palarong Pambansa for the very first time.

Geography

Antique is one of the six provinces comprising Western Visayas or Region VI, and one of the four provinces on the island of Panay.

It is bounded by the rugged central mountains of Panay, bordering on the provinces of Aklan in the northeast, Capiz on the east, Iloilo in the southeast and the Sulu Sea on the west.

Physical Features

Antique has rugged and varied land. Nogas Island, Hurao-Hurao Island and Mararison Island have long stretches of white sand beaches that are ideal for shell-hunting. Batbatan Island on the other hand, appeals to scuba divers because of the well-preserved coral reefs.

Mount Madja-as is located in Culasi, is the highest peak on the island of Panay. This  mountain is a dormant volcano with lakes and 14 waterfalls. It is said to be the legendary home of Bulalakaw, the supreme god of the ancients, and beckons as a challenge for hikers and trekkers.

Antique has nine major rivers, the longest is Sibalom River 73 km, followed by Paliwan River 58.2 km, Cangaranan River 57.4 km, Dalanas River 34.6 km, Cairawan River 31.5 km, Patnongon River 29.2 km, Tibiao River 26.4 km, Malandog River 17.8 km and Bacong River 16.2 km.

List of peaks in Antique by elevation.

Mount Madja-as 
Mount Nangtud 
Mount Baloy 
Mount Balabag 
Mount Agbalanti 
Mount Kigas 
Mount Igbanig 
Mount Sipanag 
Mount Igdalig 
Mount Tiguran 
Mount Tigatay 
Mount Dumara 
Mount Sansanan 
Mount Anoy 
Mount Balabag, Seb.  
Mount Acotay 
Mount Tinayunga  
Mount Tuno 
Mount Tigancal 
Mount Tigbararing 
Mount Tigdagano 
Mount Manlagbo 
Mount Aningalan

River systems

List of rivers in Antique by length.

Sibalom River 73 km
Paliwan River 58.2 km
Cangaranan River 57.4 km
Dalanas River 34.6 km
Tipulu-an River 33.1 km *
Cairawan River 31.5 km
Maninila River 31.1 km *
Patnongon River 29.2 km
Tibiao River 26.4 km
Mali-ao River 26.3 km *
Cadi-an River 25 km *
Cabay-ang River 19.5 km *
Paningayan River, Laua-an 18.7 km *
Malandog River 17.8 km
Bacong River 16.2 km
Kigas River 16.2 km *
Mao-it River 15.8 km *
Baloy River 15.4 km *
Hamtic River 15.2 km
Carit-an River 15.1 km
Casay River 14.3 km
Bucayan River 14.1 km *
Guinsang-an River 13.8 km
Iba River 13.1 km
Bulanao River 12.3 km
Aras-Asan River 11.5 km
Inyawan River 11.4 km
Bugasong River 11.4 km
Mamara River 11.3 km *
Panganta River 10.4 km
Paningayan River, Culasi 10.4 km
Binangbang River 10.4 km
Bugang River 10.3 km
Baluon River 10.1 km
Abiera River 8.7 km
Dao River 8.6 km
Igpasungaw River 8.2 km

Legend: * With asterisk means Tributary River

Waterfalls
List of waterfalls in Antique.
Tigmalmos Falls in Tibiao
Kamalasag Falls in Sebaste
Igpasungaw Falls in Sebaste
Bugtong Bato Falls in Tibiao
Inyawan Falls in Libertad
Sigbungon Falls in Barbaza
Macalbag Falls in Barbaza
Bulwang Falls in Sebaste
Capnayan Falls in Laua-an
Kataw Falls in Culasi
Cadiao Falls in Barbaza
Sayay Falls in Barbaza
Libog Falls in Culasi
Halat Falls in Bugasong

Climate

June to November is the rainy season in Antique and the summer start from the month of December to May.

Administrative divisions

Antique is subdivided into 18 municipalities.

San Jose de Buenavista serves as the provincial capital, the center of commerce and trade, and the seat of the provincial government and national government agencies.

Demographics

San Jose is the most populous town in the province.

Antiqueños are seafaring people that share many characteristics with their Panay neighbors. However, the steep slopes and the rugged, long mountain ranges of Antique have isolated it from the rest of Panay. Hence, they have developed their own distinct language called Kinaray-a. This dialect is of Austronesian origin characterized by the predominance of r's and schwa sounds spoken with a lilting gentle intonation.

The Antiqueños are noted for their industry. They are renowned weavers throughout the Visayas. The Bugasong patadyong, a tube cotton fabric of plaid design, is highly valued because of its fineness of weaving. Piña cloth is also produced in looms throughout the province. Wine manufactured from the sap of the coconut is a cottage industry.

Religion

The people of Antique are predominantly Christians, with the Roman Catholic Church as its largest denomination. While the Iglesia Filipina Independiente or the IFI, also known as the Aglipayan Church, is the second largest religious denomination in the province. The IFI being the tangible fruit of the Philippine Revolution against the Spanish Imperialist remains to be significant in the present-day Antique. Both the Roman Catholic and IFI are influential in both the society and politics of the province. Other religious denominations in the province are the    Protestants and Nontrinitarian such as Baptist Churches, Iglesia ni Cristo, Seventh-day Adventist Church, Jehovah's Witnesses, and the Church of Jesus Christ of Latter-day Saints, among others.

In the mountains, remnants of ancient folk beliefs persist. Babaylans or native priestesses continue to divine the future, heal the sick or conjure spells.

Economy

Agriculture 

For the year 1998, production of palay, the primary crop of the province, registered a total of 177,521 metric tons (mt.) or 4,438,025 cavans from 58,847 hectares with an average yield of 3.02 metric tons per hectare. An increase of 8,280 mt. or 16.37 percent over last years (1997) production was observed because the area harvested has increased by 9,822 hectares or 5.86 percent. However, the average yield per hectare decreased by 0.3 mt. per hectare or 0.09 percent. The average yield per hectare for irrigated lands is 3.39 mt., 2.63 mt. for rain-fed farms, and 1.57 for upland areas. The province regularly harvests enough to feed its population. This year, there is a surplus of 83,756 mt. or 2,093,900 cavans of palay.

Copra, the second major agricultural commodity, registered a total production of 15,712 mt. in 1998 reflecting a decrease of 965 mt. (5.78%) as against last years (1997) yield of 16,677 mt. The main bulk of copra came from the municipality of Caluya where this area accounts for 44 percent of the total copra output of the province. The area planted with coconuts constitutes about 34 percent of the total area of the province. Caluya, together with Pandan, account for more than half (53%) of the total provincial figure in terms of area planted, number of bearing trees.

For current year, data on production of other field crops are the following: corn, 650 metric tons; legumes (moonbeams, peanuts and other beans), 1,689 metric tons; muscovado sugar, 2,280 metric tons; root crops (camote, cassava, ube, etc.), 3,434 metric tons; vegetables (leafy, fruit and root), 870 metric tons; banana, 11,102 metric tons; and mango, 1,330 metric tons.

Fishery 

By the end of the year, preliminary data for the Bureau of Agricultural Statistics (BAS) reported that the total volume of fishery products reached 24,299 metric tons. The aquaculture sector yields the highest production during the inclusion of seaweeds in this sector.

Fishing is the major source of livelihood for households in the 15 coastal municipalities. The rich fishing grounds of the Cuyo East Pass, Sulu Sea, and the municipal waters along the approximately  coastline, make fishing a promising venture. The fishing season is year round and peaks during December to June. A total of 17,437 households are directly dependent on fishing, and 39,055 households are indirectly dependent on it.

Livestock and poultry 
Livestock and poultry raising in the province is through backyard or commercial system of production. Data from Bureau of Agricultural Statistics (BAS) revealed that from 1,441,660 head of livestock and poultry in 1997, the number rose to 1,547,944 in 1998, an additional 106,284 heads, indicating a 7.37% growth. The main reason behind this growth is the increase in poultry production of almost 7.88 percent.

Forestry 
Forest products include bamboo, buri, bariw, nito, log, charcoal, abaca, herbal vines and plants, wild flowers and others. These forest resources are of undetermined quantity, and are used as raw materials in the construction industry, furniture and handicraft.

One of the most notable flower to be thriving the Antiqueño mountains would be the rafflesia, one of the biggest flowers in the world. Rafflesia is Antique's provincial flower.

A large percentage of forestland is classified as protected (59.29 percent or 70,338.52 hectares). A little more than 50 percent of the total forestland is vegetated.

Trade, commerce, and industry 
Major products shipped out of the province are palay, rice, copra, muscovado sugar, legumes, fruits and vegetables, livestock, fish and fish preparations, and seaweeds. Manufacture items like native gifts, toys, and housewares are sold in major cities of the country and abroad. Principal mined products exported include coal, marble, silica, copper and gemstones.

The main goods entering the province are construction materials, dry goods, groceries, canned and bottled products, fertilizers and others.

The capital town of San Jose de Buenavista is the center of business in the province while Culasi is the center of the North.

Economically potential towns are San Jose, Sibalom, Caluya, Culasi, Pandan, Hamtic, Tibiao, Bugasong and Patnongon.

With the revival of Antique Airport (also called Evelio Javier Airport), commercial flights have resumed and may contribute to the development of commerce and tourism industry especially in the capital town, San Jose.

Banks and other financial institutions
As of 1998, Antique has a total of eleven rural banks, six private commercial banks: BDO, Metrobank, EastWest, Chinabank, BPI, PSBank and three government banks:the Philippine National Bank, Development Bank of the Philippines and Land Bank of the Philippines have branches at San Jose de Buenavista and Culasi, Antique. There are also 51 multi-purpose cooperatives and four credit cooperatives.

Establishments
An establishment is an economic unit which engages under a single ownership or control. The Department of Trade and Industry (DTI) classifies establishments as manufacturing, trade and service. For 1998, fourteen manufacturing establishments were reported. Such manufacturing establishments are making hollow blocks, wood furniture, steel/wood, packed foods, metal craft, threshers, soap and sidecars. Service establishments totaled 117 and a total of 294 trade establishments.

Mineral resources

Antique has deposits of metallic and non-metallic mineral resources. The metallic mineral resources include copper, gold, chromite, pyrite, iron, manganese and ferro alloy and limestone. Copper deposits in Barbaza and San Remigio are estimated to have a volume of 36,255 metric tons and 59,445 metric tons respectively. Pyrite deposits in Valderrama and Sibalom are estimated at 120,000 metric tons while limestone deposits in Culasi are estimated at 30 billion metric tons.

The Mines and Geo-Sciences Bureau (MGB) confirms the presence of gold in Mt. Dumara, Laua-an extending as far as Lumboyan, Barbaza. An analysis conducted in ore deposits indicated that 39.75 grams of gold can be found in a metric ton of ore. Non-metallic deposits include sulfides, clay, sulfur, oil and gemstones. Marble deposits are estimated at 1.8 billion metric tons in Libertad, and 2.3 billion metric tons in Pandan. Coal reserves in Caluya are estimated to be 1.6 million metric tons.

An indication of oil deposit was recently discovered at Maniguin Island in Culasi.

Tourism

The whole stretch of coastal areas in Antique is suited for scuba diving. Starting from the southern town of Antique tourists can drop by Sira-an Hot Spring, claimed to be a medical spring. The next destination is the capital town San Jose de Buenavista passing by Malandog Marker, site of the first Malayan Settlement and the newly constructed Marina Bay. Tourism amenities like restaurants, two shopping malls, pasalubong centers, accommodations and beach resorts are present. Rafflesia, the largest flower in the world, can be found in Sibalom Natural Park. In the municipalities of Patnongon and Laua-an, tourists interested in traditional methods can visit muscovado mills and watch how muscovado sugar is processed. Products made with muscovado are also available; Laua-an is noted for its long butong-butong (a candy made with muscovado sugar). Tibiao has the kawa bath, Bugtong Bato Falls and the Fish SPA. From Culasi, Mount Madja-as can be seen, the "Mount Olympus" of Antique. Sebaste has the Igpasungaw Falls, the Sebaste Inland Resort and the most visited Saint Blaise Church, where devotees of St. Blaise make a pilgrimage every year during the annual fiesta, Pandan has Malumpati Health Spring and Bugang River—declared as the cleanest body of water in the whole country by the Gawad Pangulo sa Kapaligiran—where rafting and river boating can be experienced. This is the most developed tourism area with a tour package. Libertad is known for its bariw mat and bag weaving. San Remigio is recently tagged as summer capital of the province with cool weather to enjoy and a strawberry farm.

Binirayan festival

Started in San Jose in 1974 by governor Evelio Javier, this is a week-long festival that includes colorful street parades, beach shows, plaza concerts, a beauty contest and trade fair. "Binirayan" biray, or "sailboat" in Kinaray-a (Antique's local language), refers to the Pre-Hispanic legend of the Bornean datus to reach Malandog beach, where they befriended the Atis (Aetas) and eventually started a civilization. Antique tradition holds that it was founded by Bornean Malays in the 12th century, although this had been long debunked as a hoax. According to legend, 10 Bornean datus (chieftains) claimed Panay island and their leader, Datu Sumakwel, founded the settlement in Malandog, Hamtik, Antique.

Transportation

Roads
Antique has a total Road length of  including a  National Road linking north to south of the province from Libertad to the north to Anini-y to the south. Transportation services are generally provided by tricycles, jeepneys, vans and buses. There are also daily buses served going back and forth to Manila via the roll-on/roll-off nautical highway and other neighboring provinces and cities including the Iloilo City and Kalibo.

Airports
Evelio Javier Airport (Antique Airport) is the only airport serving the province located in San Jose, Antique. And one carrier: Philippine Airlines. The other, Semirara Airport in Caluya is a municipal airport.

Seaports
Seaports in the province include the Lipata Port in Culasi and the San Jose Port in San Jose de Buenavista. Lipata Port in Culasi being used to travel to Caluya.

Government

Education

Universities and colleges

 Advance Central College (ACC) (San Jose, Antique)
 University of Antique (Main Campus) Sibalom, Antique
 University of Antique (Tibiao Campus)
 University of Antique (Hamtic Campus)
 University of Antique (Caluya Campus)
 University of Antique (Libertad Campus)
 Pandan Bay Institute (Pandan, Antique)
 Saint Anthony's College (San Jose, Antique)
 STI Antique (San Jose, Antique)
 Vicente A. Javier Memorial Community College (Culasi, Antique)

Notable people
Loren Legarda - senator, journalist, and UN Global Champion for Resilience
Jerry Navarro Elizalde - Philippine National Artist for Visual Arts - Painting
Evelio Javier - Filipino lawyer, civil servant, politician, and an opposition leader during the regime of President Ferdinand Marcos. His assassination on February 11, 1986, allegedly by allies of Marcos, was one of the sparks of the People Power Revolution later that month.
Isko Moreno - mayor of Manila, whose father is from San Joaquin, Iloilo but grew up in Hamtic, Antique and San Jose de Buenavista.
 John Iremil Teodoro - Filipino writer, university professor and freelance journalist. He is also a multi-awarded poet and playwright, one of the country's leading pioneers in gay literature and the most published author in Kinaray-a to date.
Alex C. Delos Santos - a Karay-a writer and theater artist based in San Jose, Antique, the Philippines. He completed his Master of Education with an academic excellence award from the University of the Philippines in the Visayas. His research and writing interests are in culture and arts and gay literature.
Richard Yee - Filipino professional basketball player who last played for the Barako Bull Energy Boosters in the Philippine Basketball Association.
Alberto A. Villavert - Filipino politician who led the Philippine Province of Antique between 1937 and 1946 both as an appointed and elected Governor. He was first elected as presidente municipal (town mayor) of Antique's capital town of San Jose in 1928 and was the youngest presidente municipal in his time at the age of 24 and then became governor of the province in 1937. Villavert became an Antique Representative of the National Assembly from 1943 to 1944. During World War II, he served in the USAFFE and subsequently appointed as Governor of the Province again from 1946 to 1947 and then elected and served the same post from 1948 – 1951.
Megan Young - Filipino-American actress, model, TV Host and beauty queen. She won the Miss World Philippines title and was later crowned as Miss World 2013 in Bali, Indonesia. She is the daughter of Victoria Talde who hails from Pandan, Antique.
Lauren Anne Young - Filipino-American actress and model. She is the younger sister of actress and Miss World 2013 Megan Young.
Genevieve L. Asenjo - Filipino poet, novelist, translator and literary scholar in Kinaray-a, Hiligaynon and Filipino. Asenjo is an associate professor at De La Salle University in Manila. In 2010, she founded Balay Sugidanun (The House of Storytelling).
Lisa Macuja-Elizalde - Ballerina
Calixto Zaldivar – former representative, Lone District of Antique (1934–1935), former Governor of Antique (1951–1955) and former Associate Justice of the Supreme Court (1964–1974). Former president of the National Lay Organization of the Iglesia Filipina.  Honored at the Bantayog ng mga Bayani as among the heroes and martyrs who fought the authoritarian dictatorship of Ferdinand Marcos.
Nelia Sancho (1951-2022) - Filipina Beauty Queen and Fashion Model born in Botbot, Pandan, Antique was Binibining Pilipinas 1969 1st-Runner Up to Gloria Diaz, and Queen of the Pacific 1971 winner.
Jansen Magpusao - actor from Pandan, Antique who portrayed the lead role in 2019 Cinemalaya film John Denver Trending by Direk Arden Rod Condez
Alfredo Siojo Lim, former Senator and Former Mayor of City of Manila. He is the Son of Quintin Lim Sr.

Notes

References
 PPDO. Provincial Development & Physical Framework Plan. San Jose, Antique. 2008
 Vanzi, Sol Jose. "The Many Facets of Antique." Philippine Headline News Online.
 Website of the Provincial Government of Antique (old)

External links

 

 
1780 establishments in the Philippines
Provinces of the Philippines
Provinces of Western Visayas
States and territories established in 1780